The 2020 Tri Nations Series was the seventeenth edition of the annual southern hemisphere competition, involving Argentina, Australia and New Zealand. On 16 October 2020, 2019 Rugby Championship winners and 2019 Rugby World Cup champions South Africa confirmed their withdrawal from the originally planned 2020 Rugby Championship due to South African government travel restrictions, player welfare and safety concerns related to COVID-19. This meant that the competition temporarily returned to its previous Tri-Nations format - played across six weekends with each team playing each other twice.

As a result of the COVID-19 pandemic, the tournament was moved to later in the year than usual. It had been mooted that all matches might be played in New Zealand, however, in September 2020 it was announced that all matches would be held in Australia rather than in all of the competing nations.

Background
The competition was operated by SANZAAR, a joint venture of the four countries' national unions, and known for sponsorship reasons as The Investec Tri Nations Series in New Zealand, The eToro Tri Nations Series in Australia, and The Personal Tri Nations Series in Argentina.

The format for the 2020 tournament should have returned to the previous Championship format which was used in 2018, after the shortening of the 2019 edition due to the World Cup. Each side would have played the others once at home and once away, giving a total of six matches each, and twelve in total. A win earns a team four league points, a draw two league points, and a loss by eight or more points zero league points. A bonus point is earned in one of two ways: by scoring at least three tries more than the opponent in a match, or losing by seven points or fewer. The competition winner is the side with the most points at the end of the tournament.

The competition went through several schedule changes throughout 2020. The dates and venues for the original tournament were confirmed on 4 February, with South Africa being the final nation to announce their home Tests for the first half of the international season.
New Zealand Rugby, the Argentine Rugby Union, and Rugby Australia announced their Test schedules for the 2020 Rugby Championship on 2 December 2019, 8 January and 30 January respectively. These dates ultimately changed due to the COVID-19 pandemic and a second schedule was released, where double-headed games would take place in Australia across six weekends. On 8 October, the schedule was revised to allow a quarantine period for New Zealand on their return home (to avoid a clash with Christmas), and therefore round six was split and the Australia v New Zealand game moved to 31 October. Following the withdrawal of South Africa from the tournament, the competition reverted to its Tri-Nations format (not played since Argentina joined the competition in 2012) with the tournament played over six consecutive weekends with only one game played each round, rather than the originally planned double headers.

The global quarantining measures and need to maintain a bubble meant that match official neutrality was not possible, and the team of match officials came from Australia and New Zealand. All coaches were supportive of this necessary position - including the two Australia-New Zealand games which were fairly appointed in the same manner as that of the first two Bledisloe Cup matches.

Other cups 
The Bledisloe Cup, Mandela Challenge Plate, Freedom Cup and the Puma Trophy are contested annually during the Rugby Championship by select teams.

The Bledisloe Cup is traditionally contested by Australia and New Zealand in two home-and-away legs, with an additional leg in non-World Cup years, as is the case in 2020. However, due to the special circumstances of this edition due to the COVID-19 pandemic, the Bledisloe Cup was contested over four Tests: two stand-alone matches played in New Zealand in October in consecutive Sundays, and a further two to be hosted in Australia which will double as the first two Rugby Championship fixtures. New Zealand retained the trophy for an 18th consecutive year after winning Game 2 (27-7) and Game 3 (5-43); Australia won Game 4 (24-22), and Game 1 finished in a 16-all draw.

Unlike the Bledisloe Cup, the Mandela Challenge Plate (contested between Australia and South Africa), the Freedom Cup (contested between New Zealand and South Africa) and the Puma Trophy (Argentina and Australia) are not decided by a third match. The teams play each other twice during the Rugby Championship (but only once in Rugby World Cup years), and the challengers are required to beat the holders in both games to win the plate or trophy.

Overview
The 2020 Tri Nations Series had multiple elements of the unknown; they have come about as a result of many changes within the national setups, as is often the case in a year post-World Cup.
The 2020 tournament sees a mix of the outgoing World Champions and current World No. 2 ranked All Blacks, an expected resurgent Wallabies (World Ranking of 6th), and a Los Pumas side (ranked 11th) looking to build on their 2019 record and the preceding 2020 Super Rugby season, all clashing heads.

A number of senior players retired from International duty from all four of the sides at the conclusion of the 2019 season and new Head Coaches were appointed, including significantly new coaching setups at the All Blacks, Wallabies and Springboks. The Rugby Championship was the first testing ground for the three teams since their respective changes, and the first round of International Rugby for them all since the 2019 Rugby World Cup, after the July Internationals were either cancelled or postponed due to the COVID-19 pandemic.

Table

Fixtures

Matchday 1

Notes:
 Noah Lolesio, Fraser McReight, Tate McDermott and Irae Simone (all Australia) made their international debuts.
 New Zealand retained the Bledisloe Cup for the 18th consecutive time.
 New Zealand recorded their largest winning margin over Australia, surpassing the 37-point difference set in 1996.

Matchday 2

Notes:
 James Slipper (Australia) became the thirteenth Wallaby to earn his 100th test cap.
 Angus Bell, Lachlan Swinton and Tom Wright (all Australia) and Asafo Aumua, Cullen Grace, Akira Ioane and Will Jordan (all New Zealand) made their international debut.
 Patrick Tuipulotu was originally named on the bench, but withdrew ahead of kick off and was replaced by Tupou Vaa'i.
 Australia and New Zealand played each other for the fourth time in 2020, the most games between the two nations in one year since the four-test Bledisloe Cup series in 2010.

Matchday 3

Notes:
 Santiago Chocobares and Santiago Grondona (both Argentina) made their international debuts.
 This was Argentina's first win over New Zealand in 30 attempts.
 This was New Zealand's first loss in Sydney since 2015 when they lost 27–19 to Australia in the 2015 Rugby Championship match at Stadium Australia. 
 New Zealand lost back-to-back matches for the first time since 2011.
 Nicolás Sánchez scored the most points for Argentina in a single-match against New Zealand, surpassing Hugo Porta's 21 points in the 21–21 draw at the Estadio Arquitecto Ricardo Etcheverry in 1985.

Matchday 4

Notes:
 This is the first drawn match between these two sides since their 19–19 draw in 1987.

Matchday 5

Notes:
 Lucas Paulos (Argentina) made his international debut.
 Joe Moody (New Zealand) earned his 50th test cap.
 New Zealand kept Argentina scoreless for the first time.

Matchday 6

Notes:
 Francisco Gorrissen and Domingo Miotti (Argentina) made their international debuts.
 Argentina and Australia drew back-to-matches for the first time.
 Australia retained the Puma Trophy.

Squads

Note: Ages, caps and clubs/franchises are of 31 October 2020 – the starting date of the tournament

Jerónimo De la Fuente was Argentina's captain for the final Test (Matchday 6) against Australia.

Argentina
On October 2, 2020 Argentina named a 45-man roster for the Rugby Championship.

Australia
The Wallabies squad for the 2020 Rugby Championship was announced on 13 September 2020.

New Zealand
All Blacks 38-man traveling squad for the 2020 Tri Nations Series.

See also
 History of rugby union matches between Argentina and Australia
 History of rugby union matches between Argentina and New Zealand
 History of rugby union matches between Australia and New Zealand
 Bledisloe Cup
 Puma Trophy
 2020 end-of-year rugby union internationals

References

2020
2020 in Argentine rugby union
2020 in Australian rugby union
2020 in New Zealand rugby union
2020 in South African rugby union
Tri Nations Series
Tri Nations Series
Tri Nations Series
Tri Nations Series
Tri Nations Series